Jon O. Nelson (born January 6, 1953) is an American politician. He is a member of the North Dakota House of Representatives from the 14th District, serving on the legislature since 1996. He is a member of the Republican party.

References

Living people
1953 births
People from Rugby, North Dakota
Republican Party members of the North Dakota House of Representatives
21st-century American politicians